Mononchoides is a genus of nematodes belonging to the family Diplogastridae.

The genus has almost cosmopolitan distribution.

Species:

Mononchoides adjunctus 
Mononchoides albus 
Mononchoides americanus 
Mononchoides andersoni 
Mononchoides andrassyi 
Mononchoides aphodii 
Mononchoides armatus 
Mononchoides asiaticus 
Mononchoides bicornis 
Mononchoides bollingeri 
Mononchoides changi 
Mononchoides composticola 
Mononchoides elegans 
Mononchoides filicaudatus 
Mononchoides flagellicaudatus 
Mononchoides fortidens 
Mononchoides gracilis 
Mononchoides intermedius 
Mononchoides iranicus 
Mononchoides isolae 
Mononchoides leptospiculum 
Mononchoides linocercus 
Mononchoides longicauda 
Mononchoides longicaudatus 
Mononchoides macrospiculum 
Mononchoides microstomus 
Mononchoides paesleri 
Mononchoides paramonovi 
Mononchoides parastriatus 
Mononchoides piracicabensis 
Mononchoides pulcher 
Mononchoides pulcherrimus 
Mononchoides pylophilus 
Mononchoides rahmi 
Mononchoides rhabdoderma 
Mononchoides ruffoi 
Mononchoides schwemmlei 
Mononchoides splendidus 
Mononchoides striatulus 
Mononchoides striatus 
Mononchoides subamericanus 
Mononchoides subdentatus 
Mononchoides trichiuroides 
Mononchoides trichuris 
Mononchoides vulgaris

References

Nematodes